Blair, Nevada is a mining ghost town in Esmeralda County, Nevada.

History
Today a historical marker commemorates Blair along State Route 265 just north of Silver Peak. At one time Blair was a thriving, albeit short-lived, mining boom town. As mining reached a fever pitch in Nevada during the Tonopah boom, the effects spidered out in all directions to revive many a dormant mining town. Nearby, in Silver Peak, land speculators were driving land prices so artificially high that the 100-stamp mill planned for Silver Peak was relocated and built a mile and a half west, where it became the hub of Blair. It was the Pittsburg-Silver Peak Gold Mining Company that was responsible for the large mill that went up in 1907; at the time it was Nevada's largest such facility. They constructed the 17 and half mile Silver Peak Railroad the previous year.

Blair had a post office from November 1906 to December 1915.

The Blair Press newspaper operated from about November 3, 1906 until July 23, 1909 and then from September 3, 1909 until June 17, 1910.  The Silver Peak Post moved from Silver Peak, Nevada to Blair in January 1907 and was renamed the Blair Booster on March 13, 1907.  The Blair Booster failed on June 12, 1907 and the plant was moved to Millers, Nevada.

By 1920, Blair was a ghost town. Besides the historical marker the only reminders of the town are the remains of stone buildings and the foundation of the old mill.

References

External links
Blair ghost town (ghosttowns.com). Includes photo gallery.
Panoramic photograph of Blair (Nev.), circa 1907 (University of Las Vegas)
"Mines and Plants of the Pittsburg Silver Peak," pp. 657–661, Mining and Scientific Press, Volume 98, 1909.  Includes photo of the 100 stamp mill.
 Smith, Lyon, "Operation of the Pittsburgh-Silver Peak Mill," pp. 595–599, Engineering and Mining Journal, v. 98, October 3, 1914.  Includes two photos ( 1)
 Stephen E. Drew, Chief Curator (retired) California State Railroad Museum, "Railroad Motor Cars of Nevada – Part II,"  March 31, 2016.  Includes "Excursion to Tonopah, of Blair Base Ball Team, Blair, Nev."
 Robert Stoldal, "Leach Started the 1908 Project Which involved Blair," January 18, 2018.  Postcards by Clarence Leach of the Blair Hotel and of the "100 Stamp Mill and Cyanide Plant, Pittsburgh Silver Peak Gold Mining Co, Blair, Nev."

Ghost towns in Esmeralda County, Nevada
Ghost towns in Nevada
Mining communities in Nevada
Nevada historical markers